Conor McCann (born 1992 in Randalstown, County Antrim) is a Northern Irish sportsperson.  He plays hurling with his local club Kickhams Creggan and has been a member of the Antrim senior inter-county hurling team since 2011.

Honours

Kickhams GAC Creggan
Antrim Senior Football Championship (1): 2021

Antrim
National League Division 2A (1): 2020
Joe McDonagh Cup (2): 2020 (c) 2022

Individual
 Joe McDonagh Cup Player of the Year (1): 2020
 Joe McDonagh Cup Team of the Year (1): 2020

References

1992 births
Living people
Kickhams Creggan hurlers
Antrim inter-county hurlers
Sportspeople from County Antrim